Sandhutton is a small village and civil parish in Hambleton District of North Yorkshire, England. It has been referred to as Hutton, Hutton (Sand), and Sand Hutton. The name derives from Old English  which translates as a sharply projecting piece of sandy ground with an enclosure, farmstead or village upon it.

East of the village, on the road to Carlton Miniott, is the Sand Hutton Cross which is now a listed monument. The cross marked the point at which three parishes met and is designated due to the fact that it has survived despite intensive arable farming in the area.

In 2017, a  solar farm was installed to the east of the village. The scheme involved the placing of 20,000 photovoltaic panels that would generate up to 5 MW and would have a life expectancy of 25 years.

Sandhutton is the location of Breckenbrough School, an independent special school.

Transport
The village lies on the A167 road which has a junction with the A61 road just south of the village at Busby Stoop.

References

External links

Villages in North Yorkshire
Civil parishes in North Yorkshire